Binko Ganev Kolev is a Bulgarian Olympic middle-distance runner. He represented his country at the 1980 Summer Olympics.

References 

Bulgarian male middle-distance runners
Olympic athletes of Bulgaria
1958 births
Athletes (track and field) at the 1980 Summer Olympics
Living people